The churches of Pottsville are numerous and diverse. Founded by John Pott to celebrate religious freedom, Pottsville, Pennsylvania has many historic and significant churches.

Episcopal

Lutheran

Methodist

Roman Catholic

See also
Partners for Sacred Places

External links
Churches in Philadelphia
Philadelphia Architects and Buildings

Pottsville, Pennsylvania
Churches in Pennsylvania